Oskitz Estefanía Gil (born 12 October 1986 in Pasaia, Gipuzkoa), known simply as Oskitz, is a Spanish former footballer who played as a forward.

External links

1986 births
Living people
People from Pasaia
Sportspeople from Gipuzkoa
Spanish footballers
Footballers from the Basque Country (autonomous community)
Association football forwards
La Liga players
Segunda División players
Segunda División B players
Tercera División players
Real Sociedad B footballers
Real Sociedad footballers
SD Eibar footballers
CD Eldense footballers
Écija Balompié players
Arandina CF players
Real Sociedad C footballers
Spain youth international footballers